Kitui West Constituency is an electoral constituency in Kenya. It is one of eight constituencies in Kitui County, which was established for the 1966 elections.

Members of Parliament

Wards

References 

Constituencies in Kitui County
Constituencies in Eastern Province (Kenya)
1966 establishments in Kenya
Constituencies established in 1966